The 2011 Mid-American Conference women's basketball tournament was the post-season basketball tournament for the Mid-American Conference (MAC) 2010–11 college basketball season. The 2011 tournament was held March 5–12, 2011. Second seeded Bowling Green won the championship over fifth seeded Eastern Michigan. Lauren Prochaska of Bowling Green was the MVP.

Format
The top four seeds received byes into the quarterfinals.  The winners of each division were awarded the #1 and #2 seeds.  The team with the best record of the two receives the #1 seed.  First round games will be played on campus sites at the higher seed.  The remaining rounds were held at Quicken Loans Arena.

Seeds

Bracket

All-Tournament Team
Tournament MVP – Lauren Prochaska, Bowling Green

References

Mid-American Conference women's basketball tournament
2010–11 Mid-American Conference women's basketball season
MAC women's basketball tournament
MAC women's basketball tournament
Basketball competitions in Cleveland
College basketball tournaments in Ohio
Women's sports in Ohio
2010s in Cleveland